is a Japanese manga series created by the duo Yoshinori Nakai and Takashi Shimada, known as Yudetamago. It follows Suguru Kinniku, a superhero who must win a wrestling tournament to retain the title of prince of Planet Kinniku. Nakai and Takashi planned the series when they were attending high school originally as a parody to Ultraman.

The manga was originally published in Shueisha's shōnen manga magazine Weekly Shōnen Jump from 1979 to 1987, and was first adapted by Toei Animation into a 137-episode anime series broadcast on Nippon Television from 1983 to 1986. It restarted publication in 2011 in Shueisha's web magazine Shū Play News, and has spawned spin-off manga and anime series, video games, anime films, and several Kinnikuman-related merchandise.

There is also a sequel, the  manga that was serialized in Weekly Playboy between 1998 and 2004. It was published in North America by Viz Media under the title of Ultimate Muscle. It was also adapted into three different television series, all of which were broadcast on TV Tokyo in Japan and released in North America by 4Kids Entertainment.

Kinnikuman is one of the best-selling manga series in Japan, selling over 77 million copies by 2021. As popular as was the anime series and its merchandise, such as Kinkeshi, a line of action figures released as M.U.S.C.L.E. in North America. It received the Shogakukan Manga Award for children's manga in 1984.

A new anime adaptation celebrating the 40th anniversary of the original anime television series has been announced.

Plot

Kinnikuman

The story involves Kinnikuman (real name Suguru Kinniku), a clumsy, foolish, comical superhero who discovers that he is the missing prince of the planet Kinniku (known for producing the greatest superheroes in the universe). Since he is a clumsy fool, however, he must prove himself worthy of the throne. To do so he enters wrestling competitions and battles evil Chojin, culminating in a tournament between Kinnikuman and five pretenders to the throne: Kinnikuman Big Body, Soldier, Zebra, Mariposa and Super Phoenix. Many of Kinnikuman's allies begin as villains (Ramenman, Buffalo Man, Ashuraman and Warsman) or arrogant heroes (Terryman, Robin Mask and Wolfman).

Ultimate Muscle

Mantaro Muscle (also known as Kid Muscle, Mantaro Kinniku in the Japanese version) is the spoiled son of superhero wrestler King Muscle (Kinnikuman in the Japanese version). After 28 years of peace, the Seigi Choujins' (Muscle League) old enemies regroup and form the Demon Manufacturing Plant (dMp, known in the English version as Destruction, Mayhem and Pain). The Muscle League has lost its edge and are overwhelmed by the young, well-trained fighters. Recognizing their weakness, the Seigi Chojin reopen the Hercules Factory (a school for superheroes) and begin training a new generation of heroes to take on the dMp. At first unwilling, Mantaro (Kid Muscle) is one of the young heroes and defeats his father to prove his readiness to graduate. He and the other new Seigi Choujin defeat several members of the dMp and meet Kevin Mask, who quits dMp when he discovers their lack of honor. They also battle Sunshine and his pupils, who destroy the dMp after developing a renewed respect for the fighting spirit of the Seigi Choujins. The manga continues with the New Generation Replacement Tournament, Mantaro's challenge to master his inherited potential (Kajiba no Kuso Chikara, "burning inner strength" or "the fire"), the return of the Chojin Olympics, a fight with the Demon Seed (a villainous group), a backstory for Robin Mask and a tag-team tournament set in the past. Although the manga begins as a fairly lighthearted, humorous (albeit violent) story, later arcs (the No Respect and Demon Seed storylines in particular) have a darker tone and frequently deal with psychological trauma.

Publication

Yoshinori Nakai and Takashi Shimada (collectively known as "Yudetamago"), friends since fourth grade, decided to create a manga series in high school. Before its regular publication, the series (originally a parody of Ultraman) was released as two one-shots in Shueisha's magazine Weekly Shōnen Jump in December 1978 and March 1979:  which won the Akatsuka Award, and  Its serialization began in the May 1979 issue and concluded in March 1987. Shueisha collected its 387 chapters into 36 tankōbon, releasing them from February 15, 1980, to April 15, 1988.

The first 36 volumes were re-published as part of the Jump Comics Selection line in 26 volumes from July 19, 1994, to August 26, 1996, as part of the Jump Comics Deluxe line in 18 aizōban volumes from January 14 to November 18, 1999 and on June 6, 2013, all 36 were published in shinsōban format.

A one-shot, was published in Kadokawa Shoten's Kakutō Ace in January 1996. Despite the title, the series only began regular publication on November 28, 2011, in Shū Play News, Shueisha's web version of Weekly Playboy. The 37th tankōbon was released on January 29, 2010, and the latest—the 81st volume—was released on March 17, 2023. Starting on July 5, 2012, e-book volumes began to be published as part of the Jump Comics Digital line; the latest digital volume publication date coincides with the print edition.

Since the series' 2011 restart, Yudetamago has published two related one-shots in Shueisha's magazines. In 2015, a 43-page one-shot titled "Kinnikuman Chōjin Retsuden" (Kinnikuman Superman Biographies) was released in Grand Jump to unfold the story of "supermen" characters. Four years later, the 47-page "Sayonara, Kinnikuman!! no Maki" (The 'Goodbye, Kinnikuman' Story) appeared in Weekly Shōnen Jump, depicting these supermen's arrival during the main character's retirement ceremony.

Sequel and spin-offs
It was compiled into twelve tankōbon volumes released between 1983 and 1989. In 1998 and 1999, Tatakae!! Ramenman was re-published in 9 volumes, in 2002 in 8 volumes, between 2004 and 2006 in 12 volumes, and in 2009 in 5 volumes. Toei Animation adapted it into a 35-episode anime series, which was broadcast from January 10 to September 11, 1988. In 1988, a film was released on July, and a video game on August. On March 21, 2009, the anime series and film were released in a box set. Also, a spin-off of Tatake!! Ramenman, subtitled , was released in 1995.

This 29 volumes were released by Viz Media in North America between July 5, 2004, and July 5, 2011. It was re-released in 21 aizoban volumes from September 18, 2009, to January 18, 2011. Three one-shots of Kinnikuman Legacy were published in 2002. The first, was released on February 22, and the second, was released on May 24. A guidebook titled  was released on July 19, 2002.

, an Ultimate Muscle: The Kinnikuman Legacy spin-off, was serialized in V Jump from May 2001 to March 2007 and its four tankōbon were published from August 2, 2002, to August 2007. To continue Ultimate Muscle: The Kinnikuman Legacys storyline,  was published in serial form from 2004 to 2011 and released in 28 tankōbon from November 18, 2005, to December 19, 2011.

A feminized version of the series, was created by Masashi Ogawa and began as a webcomic on the Ultra Jump Egg site in June 2008. Its first tankōbon was published on March 19, 2009, and in 2011 it was moved to the Ultra Jump website. The series concluded with the release of its 46 chapter on Ultra Jump, and the release of third tankōbon, both on June 19, 2013.

Anime adaptations

Television series

The first animated series based on Kinnikuman was produced by Toei Animation and directed by Yasuo Yamayoshi, Takenori Kawada and Tetsuo Imazawa. The 137-episode series was originally broadcast in Japan on Nippon TV from April 3, 1983, to October 1, 1986. This 46-episode series was produced by Toei and aired on Nippon TV from October 6, 1991, to September 27, 1992. The first series was packaged into 12 DVDs, released from December 6, 2002, to November 21, 2003, and the second series was released on four DVDs from December 5, 2003, to March 21, 2004.

On January 9, 2002, Kinnikuman: Second Generation premiered; the 51-episode series aired until December 25 of that year, and was released on 12 DVDs from September 21, 2002, to August 8, 2003. Licensed by 4Kids Entertainment as Ultimate Muscle: The Kinnikuman Legacy, it was broadcast on Fox Box in the United States. In 2003 a 13-episode sequel primarily focused on non-Japanese audiences was announced; it aired on Fox Box in North America, and from April 7 to June 30, 2004, in Japan. Another 13-episode spin-off, Kinnikuman Second Generation: Ultimate Muscle 2, was broadcast from January 4 to March 29, 2006, in Japan. All three series were directed by Toshiaki Komura, produced by Toei Animation and broadcast in Japan by TV Tokyo. The two spin-off series were released as two-DVD box sets on February 24 and June 23, 2006. In October 2022, Discotek Media announced that they had licensed Ultimate Muscle and will release the 77 episodes on Blu-ray Disc in early 2023.

A new anime celebrating the 40th anniversary of the original anime television series was announced on March 16, 2023.

Films

Seven films based on the original Kinnikuman were released from 1984 to 1986. The first, Kinnikuman, was directed by Takeshi Shirato and released on July 14, 1984. , the last film, was released on December 20, 1986, and was directed by Yasuo Yamayoshi. All seven films were compiled on a DVD released April 21, 2004.

Two films based on Kinnikuman: Second Generation were directed by Toshiaki Komura. The first (eponymous) film was released at the Anime Fair on July 14, 2001 and the second, was released at the same venue on July 20, 2002. The films were released on DVD on May 12, 2002, and April 21, 2003, respectively.

Related media

With the manga's popularity, Bandai produced a brand of eraser-like action figures (keshi) titled Kinkeshi between 1983 and 1987. In Japan, Bandai has released 418 different types of figures, and it was mainly sold through Gashapon. As it attracted Northern American market's interest it was brought by Mattel under the name M.U.S.C.L.E., and a total of 236 figures were traded domestically in the 1980s. In 2007, Toei asked fans if they would like to see all 418 figure types included in the Kinnikuman complete box set. On December 20, 2008, the box set with all the two first series episodes, all seven films, a TV special, and all the figures was released. Aside from this most known series of products, a myriad of other Kinnikuman-based merchandise were released both in Japan and in the America, which vary from action figures to plush dolls, from key holders to pen drives, from picture books to trading card games.

Video games
Several video games based on the series were released. The first were for home computers; a simulation game was released for the PC-88 in November 1984, followed by the 1985 fighting game . The first console game (Tag Team Match: MUSCLE) was released on November 8, 1985, for Nintendo Entertainment System, and the last game was released for PlayStation 2 on September 25, 2008. The social networking service GREE released  on February 27, 2014.

Reception
The manga series has received several awards and sold well during both its 1980s serialization and its 2010s revival. In 1984, Kinnikuman won the 30th Shogakukan Manga Award in the category Best Children's Manga. The 2013 edition of Takarajimasha's guidebook Kono Manga ga Sugoi!, a survey of the manga and publishing industries, named Kinnikuman the seventh-best manga series for male readers. Media Factory's Da Vinci magazine ranked it 23rd on the "Book of the Year" in 2019. Several volumes of the series have been featured on Oricon's weekly chart of best-selling manga in Japan; all volumes between the 40th and the 66th have reached the top 20. Between 2008 and 2010, five volumes of Kinnikuman II Sei: Kyūkyoku no Chōjin Tag Hen also ranked on Oricon's top 30 list. The series as whole has sold more than 77 million copies in Japan as of 2021. As well as Kinnikumans manga was considered a hit, the series' merchandise in general was also successful. Bandai reports that over 180 million units of Kinkeshi were sold in Japan. Shaenon K. Garrity said, "The M.U.S.C.L.E. figurines ... were the sole American extrusion of a 1980s manga/anime/licensing phenomenon."

The original 1983 anime series was popular, premiering with a rating over 20 percent. Despite being considered "too old to be marketable on American television" by 4Kids in the 2000s, the 2008 Kinnikuman complete box set had 25,000 reservation requests by August in Japan. In 2005, Japanese television network TV Asahi conducted a "Top 100" online web poll and nationwide survey; Kinnikuman placed 97th in the online poll and Ultimate Muscle placed 39th in the survey. In 2006, TV Asahi conducted another online poll for the top one hundred anime, and Kinnikuman placed 12th in the "Celebrity List". In France, however, it caused some controversy because of the depiction of a character's garment featuring a swastika; the episode in which the character appeared was requested to be removed from air. 

Garrity called Kinnikuman a "cross between superhero parody and pro-wrestling goofiness". Liann Cooper of the Anime News Network said that the "artwork alone is enough to clothesline itself and the whole concept of superhero wrestlers is like a manga-fied Mucha Lucha", but Ultimate Muscle "is actually pretty funny". Eduardo M. Chavez of Mania.com wrote that in 1979, "the series relied on its comedy and action to bring in an audience." Ultimate Muscle, while "keeping some of the old silliness", adds "some depth through a mature writing style and better action scenes." On T.H.E.M Anime Reviews, Christi wrote, "Overall, Ultimate Muscle is the best thing about the Fox Box anthology." She praised the "funny, and in their own disgusting way, charming" characters, its "crisp and well-done" animation and the "very clean and appealing" character designs.

Legacy
Widely regarded as a classic manga series, it has been cited by Fullmetal Alchemist creator Hiromu Arakawa as a series she "love[s]" and as an influence to her work, as well as by Fairy Tails Hiro Mashima. Assassination Classrooms Yūsei Matsui cited it as one of his favorite mangas, while Yoshihiro Togashi was influenced by Kinnikuman on shifting the focus of his Yu Yu Hakusho from occult detective fiction to the martial arts genre based on a similar shift Kinnikuman did from comedy to action.

Moreover, Kinnikuman has inspired real life wrestling events. At the Fight Entertainment Group's Dynamite!! 2008 martial arts event at the Saitama Super Arena, Bob Sapp fought Kid Muscle (played by Akihiko Tanaka) in an MMA match. Toei Animation announced a Kinnikumania 2009 wrestling event, scheduled at the JCB Hall in Tokyo Dome City on May 29, 2009, for the manga's 30th anniversary.

Kinnikuman's enduring popularity is also shown by it being used to co-promote Green Lantern in 2011 for the Japanese release of the film, and other characters of it appearing other merchandise, such as a series-themed onigiri and a pollen mask advertisement.

Notes

Japanese

References

External links

Official Kinnikuman  website 
Official Kinnikuman  upcoming anime website 
Official Bandai Channel Kinnikuman Generations anime website 
Official Kinnikuman Muscle video game website  
Official Kinnikuman Muscle Grand Prix 2 video game website 

 
1979 manga
1980s toys
1983 anime television series debuts
1991 anime television series debuts
1998 manga
2001 manga
2002 anime television series debuts
2005 manga
2004 anime television series debuts
2006 anime television series debuts
2011 webcomic debuts
Action anime and manga
Censorship in France
Censored works
Comedy anime and manga
Discotek Media
Fantasy wrestling
Japanese webcomics
Professional wrestling comics
Seinen manga
Shōnen manga
Shueisha manga
Shueisha franchises
Toei Animation television
Toei Animation films
Toy characters
Viz Media manga
Nippon TV original programming
TV Tokyo original programming
Winners of the Shogakukan Manga Award for children's manga
Wrestling in anime and manga